The discography of American soul and R&B singer-songwriter Ledisi includes nine studio albums and 31 singles.

Studio albums

With Anibade
 Take Time
 Ledisi and Anibade Live Recordings Vol. 1

Singles

Other charted songs

Other appearances
The reference for all tracks listed below can be found here.

Notes

References

Ledisi
Rhythm and blues discographies
Soul music discographies
Jazz discographies